John Neuman Cook (born October 2, 1957) is an American professional golfer, who won eleven times on the PGA Tour and was a member of the Ryder Cup team in 1993. He was ranked in the top ten of the Official World Golf Ranking for 45 weeks in 1992 and 1993. Cook currently plays on the PGA Tour Champions and is a studio analyst on Golf Channel.

Early years
Born in Toledo, Ohio, Cook is the son of PGA Tour official Jim Cook and grew up in southern California. He attended Miraleste High School in Rancho Palos Verdes and graduated in 1976. In addition to golf, Cook was a promising but undersized quarterback in football through his sophomore year. He was advised by his high school golf coach (who also coached football) to concentrate on golf, which would give him his best opportunity for a collegiate scholarship. The coach, Wilbur Lucas, later said it was the only time he suggested an athlete drop a sport. Cook was also coached by former PGA Tour star Ken Venturi.

Amateur career
Cook was offered a scholarship to Ohio State University in Columbus, and was personally advised to accept by Jack Nicklaus and Tom Weiskopf. He was a member of the Buckeyes' 1979 NCAA Championship team, which also included Joey Sindelar.

Cook won the U.S. Amateur in 1978 at age 20, and nearly won it again in 1979, falling to Mark O'Meara in the finals. He won the Sunnehanna Amateur in 1977 and 1979 and the California State Amateur in 1975. Cook won the Ohio Amateur in 1978 and 1979, and also won the 1978 and 1979 Northeast Amateur held at Wannamoisett Country Club. Following the 1979 U.S. Amateur in early September, Cook turned professional.

PGA Tour
Cook played his first PGA Tour event as a professional in September 1979. He played the Anheuser-Busch Golf Classic, the tour's annual event in Napa County, California on a sponsor's exemption. The Associated Press opened its report by stating, "A professional golfing career that will be watched closely, that of 1978 U.S. Amateur golf champion John Cook, began today in Napa's $300,000 PGA Tour event."

Cook's first PGA Tour victory came in the 1981 storm-plagued Bing Crosby National Pro-Am. The event was shortened to 54 holes due to the weather conditions. Cook won the title on the third extra hole after a five-way sudden-death playoff that included Hale Irwin, Bobby Clampett, Ben Crenshaw, and Barney Thompson. Irwin, the last of the four men that Cook eliminated in the playoff, was gracious in defeat: "John is a special young man. He deserved to win. He is one of the best new young players on the tour."

Cook's second PGA Tour win came in 1983 at the Canadian Open. He won with a birdie putt on the sixth extra hole of a playoff against Johnny Miller, after both players parred the first five extra holes.

At the 1990 Las Vegas Invitational, Cook lost a playoff to Bob Tway in memorable fashion. Tway won the playoff with a routine par.

In 1992, Cook won three tour events, including a two-shot victory at the United Airlines Hawaiian Open after shooting two closing rounds of 65. He moved into the top-10 of the Official World Golf Ranking for the first time that year.

Cook has had seven top-10 finishes in major championships. The closest he came to winning a major during his career was when he led The Open Championship at Muirfield in 1992 by two shots late in the final round. Cook missed a two-foot (0.6 m) birdie putt on the 17th that would have given him a three-shot lead. He bogeyed the 18th and lost the Open by one stroke to Nick Faldo, who birdied two of the last four holes to overtake Cook. Afterward, Cook said, "I definitely let one slip away. I had a chance to win a major championship and I didn't."

Cook had at least one PGA Tour win from 1996 through 1998. His victory in the FedEx St. Jude Classic in 1996 came after his opening three rounds (64-62-63) broke the lowest total in PGA Tour history for the first 54 holes at 189.
He appeared as himself in a non-speaking role in the 1996 film Tin Cup.
The last of Cook's eleven PGA Tour wins came in the Reno-Tahoe Open in 2001 at age 43.

He was inducted into the Ohio State Varsity O Hall of Fame in 1986.

Champions Tour
In October 2007, Cook became eligible to play on the Champions Tour. In his second start, he won the AT&T Championship in San Antonio, nineteen days after his 50th birthday, two strokes ahead of Mark O'Meara and earned $240,000 for his first win in over six years. A year later, at the same event, he captured his second Champions Tour win, coming from behind with a 65 in the final round to win by three strokes over Keith Fergus.

Cook won his third career title on the Champions Tour in 2009 at the Administaff Small Business Classic by two strokes over Bob Tway and Jay Haas. Two weeks later, Cook picked up his fourth Champions Tour win at the Charles Schwab Cup Championship by five strokes over Russ Cochran. Cook set a scoring record at the tournament, shooting 22-under-par, with a 10-under-par 62 in the second round. Cook successfully defended this title in the 2010 Charles Schwab Cup Championship, winning by two strokes over Michael Allen.

Cook has had some near-misses in senior majors. At the Senior British Open at Royal Troon in 2008, he lost a playoff to Bruce Vaughan. At The Tradition in 2009 at Crosswater in Sunriver, Oregon, Cook bogeyed the 72nd hole and lost a playoff to Mike Reid. In 2011, Fred Couples defeated Cook on the third hole of a sudden-death playoff in the Senior Players Championship at Westchester.

Personal life
Cook currently resides in Windermere, Florida, with his wife Jan. He has three children. His son, Jason, played golf for Pepperdine University in Malibu, California. He is a Republican, and was unwilling to meet Bill Clinton at the White House before the 1993 Ryder Cup due to Clinton's tax hikes. 

Cook has helped design a golf course in Ashville, Ohio, with help from his sister Cathy Cook, also a former standout player at nearby Ohio State.

Amateur wins
1975 California State Amateur
1977 Sunnehanna Amateur
1978 U.S. Amateur, Northeast Amateur, Ohio Amateur
1979 Sunnehanna Amateur, Northeast Amateur, Porter Cup, Ohio Amateur

Professional wins (28)

PGA Tour wins (11)

*Note: The 1981 Bing Crosby National Pro-Am was shortened to 54 holes due to weather.

PGA Tour playoff record (3–3)

Latin American wins (2)
1982 Smirnoff Open (Brazil)
1995 Mexican Open

Other wins (5)

Other playoff record (2–1)

Champions Tour wins (10)

Champions Tour playoff record (2–6)

Results in major championships

CUT = missed the half-way cut
"T" = tied

Summary

Most consecutive cuts made – 6 (1992 Masters – 1993 U.S. Open)
Longest streak of top-10s – 2 (1992 Open Championship – 1992 PGA)

Results in The Players Championship

CUT = missed the halfway cut
WD = withdrew
"T" indicates a tie for a place

Results in World Golf Championships

1Cancelled due to 9/11

QF, R16, R32, R64 = Round in which player lost in match play
"T" = Tied
NT = No tournament

Results in senior major championships
Results are not in chronological order prior to 2017.

CUT = missed the halfway cut
"T" indicates a tie for a place

U.S. national team appearances
Amateur
Eisenhower Trophy: 1978 (winners)

Professional
World Cup: 1983 (winners)
Ryder Cup: 1993 (winners)
UBS Warburg Cup: 2001 (winners)

See also
Fall 1979 PGA Tour Qualifying School graduates
List of golfers with most Champions Tour wins

References

External links

American male golfers
Ohio State Buckeyes men's golfers
PGA Tour golfers
PGA Tour Champions golfers
Ryder Cup competitors for the United States
Golfers from Ohio
Golfers from California
Golfers from Florida
Sportspeople from Toledo, Ohio
People from Windermere, Florida
1957 births
Living people